Thomas Louis Daniel (born 1954) is an American biologist, Joan and Richard Komen Endowed Chair of Biology at University of Washington, and leads the Daniel Lab.  He was the interim director of the National Science Foundation Engineering Research Center for Sensorimotor Neural Engineering.  Since 2006, he has served on the Scientific Advisory Board for the Allen Institute for Brain Science.

Thomas graduated from the University of Wisconsin with a BS and MS, and from Duke University with a PhD, where he studied with Steven Vogel and Stephen Wainwright.
He was the Bantrell Postdoctoral Fellow in Engineering Sciences at California Institute of Technology where he studied with Ted Wu until 1984.

Awards
 1996 MacArthur Fellows Program

References

External links
 Daniel Lab Website

University of Washington faculty
University of Wisconsin–Madison alumni
Duke University alumni
Living people
MacArthur Fellows
1954 births